Poland competed at the 2015 World Aquatics Championships in Kazan, Russia from 24 July to 9 August 2015.

Medalists

Diving

Polish divers qualified for the individual spots and synchronized teams at the World Championships.

Men

High diving

Poland has qualified one high diver at the World Championships.

Open water swimming

Poland has qualified one swimmer to compete in the open water marathon.

Swimming

Polish swimmers have achieved qualifying standards in the following events (up to a maximum of 2 swimmers in each event at the A-standard entry time, and 1 at the B-standard):

Men

Women

References

External links
Polish Swimming Federation 

Nations at the 2015 World Aquatics Championships
2015 in Polish sport
Poland at the World Aquatics Championships